Jason Eck (born August 11, 1977) is an American football coach who is currently the head coach at the University of Idaho.

Coaching career

Early coaching career 
Eck began his coaching career as a graduate assistant at his alma mater Wisconsin and later Colorado. He was the offensive line coach at Idaho under Nick Holt and the Vandals' tight ends coach under Dennis Erickson. 

Eck has spent the majority of his career coaching the offensive line, with coaching stints at Winona State, Ball State, Hampton, Western Illinois, Minnesota State, Montana State, and South Dakota State. At South Dakota State, he won the AFCA FCS Assistant Coach of the Year award in 2019, his first year as the program's offensive coordinator.

Idaho (second stint) 
Eck was named the 36th head coach in program history at Idaho on December 18, 2021.

Head coaching record

References

External links 
 
 Idaho profile
 South Dakota State profile

1977 births
Living people
Sportspeople from La Crosse, Wisconsin
Players of American football from Wisconsin
Coaches of American football from Wisconsin
American football offensive linemen
Wisconsin Badgers football players
Wisconsin Badgers football coaches
Colorado Buffaloes football coaches
Idaho Vandals football coaches
Winona State Warriors football coaches
Ball State Cardinals football coaches
Hampton Pirates football coaches
Western Illinois Leathernecks football coaches
Minnesota State Mavericks football coaches
Montana State Bobcats football coaches
South Dakota State Jackrabbits football coaches